The Sun Way 28 is a French sailboat that was designed by Tony Castro as an offshore cruiser and first built in 1987.

The Sun Way 28 is a development of the Arcadia 30 and is an updated version of the Sun Dream 28.

Production
The design was built by Jeanneau in France, from 1987 until 1992, but it is now out of production.

Design
The Sun Way 28 is a recreational keelboat, built predominantly of fiberglass, with wood trim. It has a fractional sloop rig, with aluminum spars with stainless steel wire rigging. The hull has a raked stem, a rounded reverse transom, an internally mounted spade-type rudder controlled by a tiller and a fixed fin keel or optional stub keel and centerboard. The fin keel model displaces  and carries  of ballast, while the centerboard version displaces  and has twin rudders.

The boat is fitted with a Swedish Volvo 2002 diesel engine for docking and maneuvering.

The design has sleeping accommodation for four people, with a double "V"-berth in the bow cabin, a "U"-shaped settee around a drop-leaf table in the main cabin and an aft cabin with a double berth on the port side. The galley is located on the port side just forward of the companionway ladder. The galley is "L"-shaped and is equipped with a two-burner stove, an ice box and a sink. A navigation station is opposite the galley, on the starboard side. The head is located opposite the galley on the starboard side and includes a hanging locker.

See also
List of sailing boat types

References

External links

Keelboats
1980s sailboat type designs
Sailing yachts
Sailboat type designs by Tony Castro
Sailboat types built by Jeanneau